Sprigginidae is an extinct family of cephalozoans characterized by having a greater number of isomers than its sister taxon, Yorgiidae. They lived approximately 635 million years ago, in the Ediacaran period.

Distribution
Fossils are found within the Ediacaran sediments of South Australia.

Taxonomy
Sprigginidae presents 4 genera:
†Spriggina (type genus).
†Marywadea
†Cyanorus
†Praecambridium, sometimes included into Yorgiidae.

Gallery

See also
Cephalozoa
Yorgiidae

References

 
Ediacaran life